The year 1706 in science and technology involved some significant events.

Mathematics
 William Jones publishes Synopsis palmariorum matheseos or, A New Introduction to the Mathematics, Containing the Principles of Arithmetic and Geometry Demonstrated in a Short and Easie Method ... Designed for ... Beginners in which he
 proposes using the symbol π (the Greek letter pi, as an abbreviation for perimeter) to represent the ratio of the circumference of a circle to its diameter.
 introduces John Machin's quickly converging inverse-tangent series for π (pi), enabling it to be computed to 100 decimal places.

Technology
 Francis Hauksbee produces his 'Influence machine' to generate static electricity.

Publications
 Johann Jakob Scheuchzer begins publication in Zürich of his Beschreibung der Naturgeschichten des Schweitzerlands giving an account of the natural history and geology of Switzerland.
 Giovanni Battista Morgagni publishes Adversaria anatomica, the first in a series in which he describes his observations of human anatomy.

Births
 January 17 – Benjamin Franklin, American scientist and inventor, known for his experiments with electricity (died 1790)
 January 28 – John Baskerville, English printer and inventor (died 1775)
 February 11 – Nils Rosén von Rosenstein, Swedish pediatrician (died 1773)
 May 12 – François Boissier de Sauvages de Lacroix, French physician and botanist (died 1767)
 June 10 – John Dollond, English optician (died 1761)
 December 17 – Émilie du Châtelet, French mathematician and physicist (died 1749)
 Date unknown – Giuseppe Asclepi, Italian astronomer and physicist (died 1776)

Deaths
 June 15 – Giorgio Baglivi, Italian physician (born 1668)
 August 6 – Jean-Baptiste Du Hamel, French scientist, philosophe (born 1624)
 Date unknown – Jean Le Fèvre, French astronomer (born 1652)
 Date unknown – Jeanne Dumée, French astronomer (born 1660)

References

 
18th century in science
1700s in science